Xuanwei is a county-level city in the northeast of Yunnan Province, China, bordering Guizhou province to the east. It is under the administration of the prefecture-level city of Qujing.

Administrative divisions
Xuanwei City has 9 subdistricts, 13 towns and 7 townships. 
9 subdistricts

13 towns

7 townships

Food
It is famous as the origin of Xuanwei ham.

Climate

References

External links
Xuanwei City official website

County-level divisions of Qujing
Cities in Yunnan